Club Joventut Badalona, S.A.D. is a Spanish professional basketball club based in Badalona, Catalonia, Spain, playing in the Liga ACB and the EuroCup. Known to their fans as La Penya (in English, The Club), it is one of only two teams that have never been relegated from the top division of the Spanish League. The only other is Real Madrid. In 1994, Joventut de Badalona was the champion of the FIBA European Champions' Cup (today known as the EuroLeague), the first Catalan basketball club to accomplish such a grandiose achievement and the first Spanish team to do so in the Final Four format.

Well-known players have included the Margall brothers (with Josep Maria Margall), Zoran Slavnić, Jordi Villacampa, Rafael Jofresa, Raül López, Rudy Fernández, Ricky Rubio and Joe Galvin.

History 

Badalona has had a basketball team since 30 March 1930, when Joventut was founded as Penya Spirit of Badalona. Apart from basketball, the club initially had teams involved in several sports including cycling, table tennis, and football. In 1932, the club changed its name to Centre Esportiu Badaloní and in 1939, it was forced to become Club Juventud de Badalona. By 1940, basketball was established as the club's main sport and green and black were adopted as the club's colours.

As one of the founding clubs of the Spanish league, Joventut became also one of the top teams in Spain since the 1950s, developing a great rivalry with Real Madrid and with the other neighbouring teams like FC Barcelona, playing memorable duels. Joventut won their first Spanish Cup in 1948 and their two first leagues in 1967 and 1978.

In 1981, Joventut started its golden era by winning their first European title: the FIBA Korać Cup in 1981, by defeating Carrera Venezia in the final played in Barcelona by 105–104 after a game winning shot by Joe Galvin at the buzzer. Joventut repeated title in 1990, this time beating Scavolini Pesaro in the double-legged final.

One year later, in 1991, Joventut achieved their third league, the first under the ACB and repeated title in the following season, after losing the final of the FIBA European League against Partizan, that won thanks to a buzzerbeater of Saša Đorđević. However, in 1994, Joventut won the title after winning the Final Four played in Tel Aviv against Olympiacos.

After two years of decline, Joventut clinched their seventh national cup and in the 2000s, started a new golden era with players like Rudy Fernández, and Ricky Rubio developed in the youth teams of the club. During their years at Badalona, Joventut won a FIBA Europe Cup in 2006, by beating Khimki in the final, a ULEB Cup in 2008, beating Akasvayu Girona in the finals, and the eighth Copa del Rey, also in 2008.

Joventut Badalona is one of the only two teams, along with Real Madrid, to have played every year in the top league.

In the 2017–18 season, Joventut was close of the dissolution, but the shareholders voted to save the club. Finally, it could finish the season in the 15th season and avoided the relegation, despite ending in the worst position ever.

Sponsorship naming 

Club Joventut de Badalona has received diverse trade names along its history. These are the Joventut denominations along the years:

Juventud Kalso: 1965–1968
Juventud Nerva: 1968–1971
Juventud Schweppes: 1971–1977
Juventud Freixenet: 1977–1978
Joventut Freixenet: 1978–1981
Joventut Sony: 1981–1982
Joventut Fichet: 1982–1983
Joventut Massana: 1983–1984
Ron Negrita Joventut: 1984–1987
Ram Joventut: 1987–1990
Montigalà Joventut: 1990–1992
Marbella Joventut: 1992–1993
7up Joventut: 1993–1995
Festina Joventut: 1996–1998
Pinturas Bruguer Badalona: 1998–2000
DKV Joventut: 2001–2011
FIATC Joventut: 2011–2016
Divina Seguros Joventut: 2016–2019

Home arenas 
Pavelló de la Plana: (1962–72), before 1962, the team played in open air stadiums.
Pavelló d'Ausiàs March: (1972–91), also known as Pavelló Club Joventut (5,000 seats).
Palau Olímpic: (1991–present)

Players

Retired numbers 

*Even though number #5 had been retired to honor Rafael Jofresa, from 2002 to 2008 Rudy Fernández kept wearing that number during his stay at the professional team.

Current roster

Depth chart

Notable players 

 Domestic players:

Rudy Fernández
Josep Maria Margall
Josep Maria Guzmán
Ferran Laviña
Anicet Lavodrama
Raúl López
Dakota Mathias
Darryl Middleton
Álex Mumbrú
Matthew Gay
Ricky Rubio
Mike Smith
Pere Tomàs
Jordi Villacampa

(Non-EU players):

Aloysius Anagonye
Maceo Baston
Tanoka Beard
Elmer Bennett
Shawn Dawson 
Christian Eyenga
Randy Holcomb
Reggie Johnson
Charles Gaines
Harold Pressley
Corny Thompson
Clay Tucker
Andre Turner

 Bosman players:

Robert Archibald
Jamie Arnold
Luboš Bartoň
Andrew Betts
Demond Mallet
Alain Digbeu
Milan Gurović
Marcelinho Huertas
Jan-Hendrik Jagla
Simas Jasaitis
Šarūnas Vasiliauskas
Saulius Kulvietis
Alain Koffi
Nicolas Laprovittola
Pops Mensah-Bonsu
Jérôme Moïso
Henk Norel
Petar Popović
Nikola Radulović
Zoran Slavnić
Žan Tabak
Uroš Tripković
Kristaps Valters
Jesse Young

''For a complete list of current and former players, see the Joventut Badalona players category.

Players at the NBA Draft

Head coaches 

	Xavier Estruch:	1939–1941
	Luis Antoja:	1941–1943
	Gironés:	1943–1944
	Xavier Estruch:	1944–1946
	Vicenç Lleal:	1946–1947
	José Tomas:	1947–1948
	José Vila:	1947–1950
	José Maria Costa:	1950–1951
	José Grau:	1951–1953
	Joaquín Broto:	1953–1955
	J. Jiménez:	1955–1956
	Joaquín Broto:	1956–1958
	Rafael Murgadas:	1958–1959
	José Grau:	1959–1961
	Joan Canals:	1961–1962
	Antonio Molina:	1962–1963
	Albert Gasulla:	1963–1964
	Antonio Molina:	1963–1964
	Eduardo Kucharski:	1965–1969
	Josep Lluís Cortés:	1969–1972
	Clinton Morris:	1972–1973
	Josep Lluís Cortés:	1973–1975
	Eduardo Kucharski:	1975–1976
	Josep María Meléndez:	1975–1977
	Antoni Serra:	1977–1979
	Josep Lluís Cortés:	1979–1980
	Manel Comas:	1980–1982
	Joaquín Costa Prat:	1981–1982
	Jack Schrader:	1982–1983
	Aíto García Reneses:	1983–1985
	Miquel Nolis:	1985–1986
	Alfred Julbe:	1986–1989
	Herb Brown:	1989–1990
	Lolo Sainz:	1990–1993
	Željko Obradović:	1993–1994
	Pedro Martínez:	1994–1995
	Miquel Nolis:	1994–1995
	Zoran Slavnić:	1995–1996
	Alfred Julbe:	1996–2000
	Josep María Izquierdo:	1999–2001
	Manel Comas:	2000–2003
	Aíto García Reneses:	2003–2008
	Sito Alonso:	2008–2010
	Pepu Hernández:	2010–2011
	Salva Maldonado:	2011–2016
	Diego Ocampo:	2016–2018
	Carles Duran:	2018–present

Logos

Uniforms 

The Joventut jerseys have always been green with a black stripe across the chest, and the shorts have been traditionally black, with the exception of some years that have been green too. The traditional away jerseys have been white, although in 2008–09 a new silver alternate jersey was introduced.

Rivalries
Joventut has a traditional rivalry with provincial neighbours FC Barcelona. Both teams face in the Catalan basketball derby.

Season by season

Honours

Domestic competitions
Spanish League
 Winners (4): 1966–67, 1977–78, 1990–91, 1991–92
 Runners-up (10): 1958, 1959–60, 1961–62, 1968–69, 1970–71, 1972–73, 1984–85, 1986–87, 1989–90, 1992–93
Spanish Cup
 Winners (8): 1948, 1953, 1955, 1958, 1969, 1976, 1997, 2008
 Runners-up (13): 1966, 1968, 1970, 1971, 1972, 1974, 1985, 1986, 1987, 1990, 1993, 1998, 2004
Spanish Super Cup
 Winners (2): 1986, 1987
 Runners-up (1): 1988

European competitions
EuroLeague
 Winners (1): 1993–94
 Runners-up (1): 1991–92
 Final Four (2): 1992, 1994
FIBA Saporta Cup (defunct)
 Runners-up (1): 1987–88
 Semifinalists (4): 1971–72, 1972–73, 1976–77, 1985–86
FIBA Korać Cup (defunct)
 Winners (2): 1980–81, 1989–90
 Semifinalist (3): 1975–76, 1977–78, 1990–91
EuroCup Basketball
 Winners (1): 2007–08
 Semifinalists (1): 2002–03
FIBA EuroChallenge (defunct)
 Winners (1): 2005–06
European Basketball Club Super Cup (semi-official, defunct)
 Runners-up (2): 1990, 1991
 3rd place (1): 1987

Worldwide competitions
McDonald's Championship (defunct)
 Runners-up (1): 1991

Other competitions
FIBA International Christmas Tournament (defunct)
 Runners-up (3): 1967, 1970, 1978

Vielha, Spain Invitational Game
 Winners (1): 2014

Regional competitions
Catalan League
 Winners (11): 1986, 1987, 1988, 1990, 1991, 1992, 1994, 1998, 2005, 2007, 2008
 Runners-up: 1981, 1982, 1984, 1985, 1993, 1995, 1997, 1999, 2001, 2009, 2010, 2011, 2012, 2013
Catalan Championship (defunct)
 Winners (5): 1949, 1952, 1953, 1954, 1957
 Runners-up (5): 1948, 1950, 1951, 1955, 1957

Individual awards 

ACB Most Valuable Player
Tanoka Beard – 2002

ACB Rising Star/Best Young Player
Ricky Rubio – 2007
Guillem Vives – 2014

ACB Finals MVP
Corny Thompson – 1991
Mike Smith – 1992

Spanish Cup MVP
Andre Turner – 1997
Rudy Fernández – 2004, 2008

ULEB Eurocup Finals MVP
Rudy Fernández – 2008

EuroChallenge Final Four MVP
Rudy Fernández – 2006

EuroLeague Rising Star
Rudy Fernández – 2007

All-ACB Team
Rudy Fernández – 2007, 2008
Ricky Rubio – 2008
Nicolás Laprovittola  – 2019
Klemen Prepelič – 2020
Xabier López-Arostegui – 2021

ACB Slam Dunk Champion
Christian Eyenga – 2009

Wheelchair basketball 
Joventut Badalona has also a wheelchair basketball team which currently plays in the División de Honor, the Spanish top league.

In 2011 the team, which was known as Joventut GAM by sponsorship reasons, was dissolved and two years later was re-launched again. In its first season after the re-opening, the team promoted to División de Honor.

Season by season

See also 
1991 McDonald's Championship

References

External links 

 

 
Liga ACB teams
Catalan basketball teams
Basketball teams established in 1930
EuroLeague-winning clubs
Wheelchair basketball teams in Spain
1986 FIBA World Championship players